The 2005 Women's World Water Polo Championship was the seventh edition of the women's water polo tournament at the World Aquatics Championships, organised by the world governing body in aquatics, the FINA. The tournament was held at the Pavillon des Baigneurs on Île Sainte-Hélène from 17 to 29 July 2005, and was incorporated into the 2005 World Aquatics Championships in Montréal, Canada.

Teams

Group A
 
 
 
 

Group B
 
 
 
 

Group C
 
 
 
 

Group D

Preliminary round

Group A

Group B

Group C

Group D

Second round
 Saturday July 23, 2005

Classification round
 Saturday July 23, 2005 — 13th/16th place

 Monday July 25, 2005 — 9th/12th place

 Wednesday July 27, 2005 — 5th/8th place

Quarter finals
 Monday July 25, 2005

Semi finals
 Wednesday July 27, 2005

Finals
 Monday July 25, 2005 — 15th place

 Monday July 25, 2005 — 13th place

 Wednesday July 27, 2005 — 11th place

 Wednesday July 27, 2005 — 9th place

 Friday July 29, 2005 — 7th place

 Friday July 29, 2005 — 5th place

 Friday July 29, 2005 —  Bronze-medal match

 Friday July 29, 2005 —  Gold-medal match

Final ranking

Medalists

Individual awards

 Most Valuable Player
 

 Best Goalkeeper
 

 Topscorer
  — 18 goals

References

 Results
 Omega Timing

2005
women
2005 in women's water polo
Women's water polo in Canada
2005 in Canadian women's sports